Paul S. Wright,  (born 1 May 1946) is the emeritus professor in prosthetic dentistry at Barts and The London School of Medicine and Dentistry. He also chair of the General Dental Council's, Specialist Dental Education Board.

He is also consulting editor on the European Journal of Prosthodontics and Restorative Dentistry.

Education 
In 1969 Wright graduated from The London Hospital Medical College Dental School.

Career 
 1970 - 2001 General dental practice (part-time) 
 1972 Lecturer, The London Hospital Medical College Dental School 
 1980 Senior lecturer, The London Hospital Medical College Dental School 
 1982 Honorary consultant, The London Hospital Medical College Dental School
 1992 Founding editor, European Journal of Prosthodontics and Restorative Dentistry
 1999 - 2007 Dean of dentistry, Barts and The London School of Medicine and Dentistry (formerly The London Hospital Medical College Dental School) 
 2000 Professor of prosthetic dentistry, Barts and The London School of Medicine and Dentistry 
 2000 - 2001 President, British Society for the Study of Prosthetic Dentistry
 2005 - 2006 President, European Prosthodontic Association
 2007 - 2008 President, British Society of Gerodontology

Books

References

External links
 Professor Paul S. Wright Barts and The London School of Medicine and Dentistry
 Fitness to practice panellists - dentist members: Paul S Wright General Dental Council

1946 births
Academics of Barts and The London School of Medicine and Dentistry
Academics of the London Hospital Medical College
Alumni of the London Hospital Medical College
Living people
British dentists